The Instituto Superior de Engenharia de Lisboa (ISEL) is a Portuguese higher education polytechnic institution of engineering and technology. Headquartered in Lisbon and a part of the Instituto Politécnico de Lisboa.

See also
List of colleges and universities in Portugal
Higher education in Portugal

External links
Instituto Superior de Engenharia de Lisboa

Education in Lisbon
Polytechnics in Portugal